Golrudbar or Gol-e Rudbar or Galrudbar or Gelrudbar or Gol Roodbar, also rendered as Gil-i-Rudbar or Gul-i-Rudbar or Kolrudbar, may refer to:
 Bala Mahalleh-ye Golrudbar
 Mian Mahalleh-ye Golrudbar
 Pain Mahalleh-ye Golrudbar